Henryk Julian Martyna (14 November 1907 in Kraków - 17 November 1984 in Kraków) was a Polish football player, defender, key member of Polish National Team in the early 1930s.

His career started in Korona Kraków, then in 1928 moved to one of top teams of Poland - Legia Warsaw. There, stayed until 1937, then in the years 1937-1939 represented Warszawianka Warszawa. In Polish National team played in the years 1929-1936, also in Berlin’s Olympic Games. Together with Polonia Warsaw’s Jerzy Bulanow, Nawrot created a pair of excellent defenders. All together, he played in 32 games in the National Team, scoring 5 goals.

References

1907 births
1984 deaths
Footballers from Kraków
Olympic footballers of Poland
Footballers at the 1936 Summer Olympics
Poland international footballers
Polish footballers
Legia Warsaw players
Association football defenders
KS Warszawianka players
Polish Austro-Hungarians
People from the Kingdom of Galicia and Lodomeria